Rated R&B is an independent online magazine based in the United States, which is dedicated and devoted to news, topics and almost all things related to rhythm and blues (R&B) and soul music.
It publishes independent music reviews, features, interview, and media. Founded and currently edited by Keithan Samuels in August 2011, the webzine has become a leading online source for R&B and soul music news according to Samuels himself and also openly promotes underrated/unnoticed artists of that genre.
 
Reviews by Rated R&B have been mentioned in publications such as BBC,VIBE, Dazed, Essence, Forbes, The Huffington Post, Page Six, Yahoo! and Vogue. Rated R&B also publishes music premieres, exclusive live performances and playlists.

During an interview with Shannon Ramsey, the host of Incisive Entertainment's Let's Talk web series, Samuels, who first began writing articles about music in 2009, revealed the backstory and inspiration behind him launching the webzine, saying:  In 2020, eZ Toolset listed Rated R&B at number two on their 15 Top R&B Music RSS Feeds To Follow list and Feedspost also listed the webzine at number four on their Top 40 R&B Music Blogs list.

References

External links 

Internet properties established in 2011
American music websites
Online music magazines published in the United States
Online magazines
Music review websites
Black-owned companies of the United States